Amsterdam Ordnance Datum or  (NAP) is a vertical datum in use in large parts of Western Europe. Originally created for use in the Netherlands, its height was used by Prussia in 1879 for defining , and in 1955 by other European countries. In the 1990s, it was used as the reference level for the United European leveling Network (UELN) which in turn led to the European Vertical Reference System (EVRS).

Mayor Johannes Hudde of Amsterdam in a way came up with the idea after he expanded the sea dike after a flood in Amsterdam in 1675. Of course a dike should be storm-resistant to protect a city against flooding, and in this case a margin of "9 feet and 5 inches" (2.67 m - margin is defined in Amsterdam feet) was deemed enough to cope with rising water. So he measured the water level of the adjacent sea arm,  and compared it with the water level in the canals within the city itself. He found that the water level at an average summer flood in the sea arm (when the water level reaches its maximum, not counting storms) was about the same as the level on the other side of the sea-dike, plus the margin of 9 feet and 5 inches. In 1850, the datum was used at several places in Belgium, and in 1874 the German government adopted the datum for first-order levelling.

The relatively constant water level in the canals of Amsterdam, called  ("Amsterdam level", AP), was equal to the level at summer flood at sea in the sea-inlet, which changes throughout the year. AP was carried over to other areas in the Netherlands in 1860, to replace locally used levels.

Originally the zero level of NAP was the average summer flood water level in the IJ just north of the centre of Amsterdam (which was at the time, in 1684, the main shipping area, then still connected with the open sea). Currently it is physically realised by a brass benchmark on a  pile below the Dam square in Amsterdam. The brass benchmark in the Amsterdam Stopera (combined city hall and opera house), which is a tourist attraction, is no longer used as a reference point.

See also 
 Above mean sea level
 Normalnull – German height reference system derived from Amsterdam Ordnance Datum
 Normalhöhennull – Current German height reference system linked to NAP

References

External links 

 P.I. van der Weele: De geschiedenis van het N.A.P. 1971, Dutch Royal Society for Sciences, Governmental Commission for Geodesy 
 Frans J.P.M. Kwaad: Het Normaal Amsterdams Peil (NAP) - Achtergronden en geschiedenis 

Geography of the Netherlands
Vertical datums
Tides